A headliner is the main act in a music, theatre, or comedy performance.  Generally, the headliner is the final act in a performance, preceded by the opening act(s).

In music, the headliner often reserves sole permissions to the name of the tour.  Thus, tour names often reflect the name of the latest album or a popular song from the latest album of the headliner.  Additionally, the headliner is often the most famous or prominent act in the performance.

The main event is a similar concept in sports.

History
The term "headliner" dates back to the 1890s.

References

Concerts
Concert tours